Decapolis was a group of ten cities on the eastern frontier of the Roman Empire in Syria and Judea.

Decapolis or Dekapolis refers to a group or confederation of ten cities. It may also refer to:

History 
 Isaurian Decapolis in Cilicia
 Decapolis of Katakekaumene, in Lydia
 Décapole, alliance of ten towns of the Holy Roman Empire in Alsace, 1354-1679

Modern 
 Decapolis, Virginia, a community in Madison County

See also
Dodecapolis (disambiguation)